Eje or EJE may refer to:

People 
 Eje Thelin (1938–1990), Swedish trombonist
 Niels Eje (born 1954), Danish composer and oboist
 Thomas Eje (born 1957), Danish actor

Other uses 
 Eje (goddess), in Turkic religions and Tengriism
 Elgin, Joliet and Eastern Railway, a defunct, American railway
 European Journal of Endocrinology
 European Journal of Entomology